Shanley Caswell (born December 3, 1991) is an American actress. She has guest starred in television series such as CSI: NY, Bones, iCarly and The Middle.  She is best known for her starring roles in Detention (2011) as Riley Jones and as Andrea Perron in The Conjuring (2013). She recurred as Laurel Pride on NCIS: New Orleans from 2014 to 2021, spanning the series' seven seasons.

Life and career

Shanley Caswell was born and raised in Sarasota, Florida. Shanley began acting in local theater at the age of eight. While in high school, she became involved with "Teen Source", a theater troupe whose focus is to educate the teenage community on social issues.
She moved to Los Angeles to further her career in 2007, where she landed many guest-starring roles.  Her first work was modelling aged 15.   She also studied cultural anthropology at UCLA.

She made her feature film debut in Mending Fences, a television film for the Hallmark Channel and made her first major film role as one of the leads in the horror film Detention, with her starring as Riley Jones. She appeared in horror film The Conjuring, in the supporting role Andrea Perron, her second feature film, and starred as the lead role in the fairy tale update Snow White: A Deadly Summer.

Filmography

Film

Television

References

External links

1991 births
Living people
21st-century American actresses
Actors from Sarasota, Florida
American child actresses
American film actresses
American television actresses
University of California, Los Angeles alumni